Joost van Bleiswijk (born 1976, Delft) is a Dutch designer who lives in Eindhoven. 
After he graduated at the Design Academy he became known for his Outlines series.

Education
Joost van Bleiswijk is a prolific Dutch designer who gives great value to the process of making. He grew up in Delft, and studied at the Design Academy of Eindhoven, where he met his future partner, Kiki van Eijk.

Stanislas college Delft VWO Diploma obtained in 1996

Design Academy Eindhoven Juni 2001 Man and Well-Being.

Work

Next to his own collections he worked with several companies such as Ahrend, Bernhardt Design, Bruut furniture, city of Eindhoven, design connection Brainport, Lebesque, etc.
His work is sold and exhibited through (inter)national galleries as for example Moss gallery in New York City and Vivid gallery in Rotterdam, Secondome, the Holon Design Museum in Israel and the Zuiderzeemuseum in the Netherlands.

Curved and taped							2019
Interlocking panels							2019
Fusion 									2019
Brass Sculpture Private Collector					2019
Sketched								2018
Tinkering Lamps							        2017
Mechanic constructions							2016
The Protopunk								2016
The Protopunk-1						                2015
Collage 2014						                2014
Framed Frames								2014
Prop lamps								2014
NSNG rough shiny collection				                2014
Scratch Set 								2012
Collage 						                2012
Heavy Metal 				                                2013
Heavy Metal 						                2011
One more time clocks 					                2011
No screw no glue rough collection 			                2010
The Poor Man’s Gold for the Zuiderzee Museum 		                2010
Rivet Lamps 								2010
Candle lines candleholders 						2010
No screw no glue Corroded serie 					2009
Pendulum XL 								2009
Compose collection 							2008
No screw no glue collection f.e. Wallcabinet, candelabrum et. 		2008
No screw no glue collection f.e. chessboard, little clock and cabinet xl2007
No screw, no glue stainless steel collection				2006
No screw no glue in trespa 						2006
Game Table							 	2006
Single Cut Vases 							2005
Construct collection							2005
Outlines 								2005

He has also turned his attentions to the world of textiles, designing the patterns of luxury carpets.

Other activities
Lecture at Wanted Design Week Kyiv, 2009 - Lecture at Witte dame Eindhoven 2007- Guest teacher at Krabbesholm design school - Lecture at the U.N. University Tokio 2006 - Concept  belleza Universale 2005 - Concept Design-Sucks 2003/2004 - Concept scrapheap-design-challenge 2004 - Design workshops Art-quake Hoofddorp 2002/2003

References

 http://www.corunum-ceramics.nl/nl/designers/joost-van-bleiswijk
 http://www.mossonline.com/category_in-stock-exec/category_id/536
 http://www.zuiderzeemuseum.nl/nl/464/aankopen/joost-van-bleiswijk--the-poor-mans-gold/?id=1577

1976 births
Living people
Dutch designers
Design Academy Eindhoven alumni
Artists from Delft